Meyers Lake may refer to:

Meyers Lake, Ohio, a village in Ohio
Meyers Lake (Wisconsin), a lake in Wisconsin
Meyers Lake (Ontario), a lake in Canada